Lucker is a surname. Notable people with the surname include: 

 Mitch Lucker (1984–2012), American vocalist and songwriter
 Raymond Alphonse Lucker (1927–2001), American prelate of the Catholic Church
 Zöe Lucker (born 1974), English actress

See also
 Luckey